Luis Alberto is a former Argentinian football player.

In 1978, Alberto signed with the New York Arrows of the Major Indoor Soccer League.  He won three MISL championships with the Arrows.  In 1979, he played on loan to the Rochester Lancers of the North American Soccer League.  On February 10, 1982, the Arrows sold Alberto's contract to the Cleveland Force. On May 19, 1983, the force traded him to the Pittsburgh Spirit in exchange for Krys Sobieski.  On January 4, 1985, he signed with the New York Cosmos, now playing in the MISL.  The Cosmos withdrew from the league in February 1985 and released Alberto.  In March, he signed with the Wichita Wings and finished the season there.  In 1986, Alberto returned to New York to join the expansion New York Express which collapsed two-thirds of the way through the season.

References

External links
 NASL/MISL stats

1943 births
Living people
Argentine expatriate footballers
Argentine footballers
Cleveland Force (original MISL) players
Major Indoor Soccer League (1978–1992) players
New York Arrows players
New York Cosmos (MISL) players
New York Express players
North American Soccer League (1968–1984) players
Pittsburgh Spirit players
Rochester Lancers (1967–1980) players
Wichita Wings (MISL) players
Expatriate soccer players in the United States
Argentine expatriate sportspeople in the United States
Association football forwards
People from Santiago del Estero
Sportspeople from Santiago del Estero Province